Events from the year 2019 in Michigan.

Office holders

State office holders

 Governor of Michigan: Gretchen Whitmer (Democratic)
 Lieutenant Governor of Michigan: Garlin Gilchrist (Democratic) 
 Michigan Attorney General: Dana Nessel (Democratic)
 Michigan Secretary of State: Jocelyn Benson (Democratic)
 Speaker of the Michigan House of Representatives: Lee Chatfield (Republican)
 Majority Leader of the Michigan Senate: Mike Shirkey (Republican)
 Chief Justice, Michigan Supreme Court: Bridget Mary McCormack

Mayors of major cities

 Mayor of Detroit: Mike Duggan (Democrat)
 Mayor of Grand Rapids: Rosalynn Bliss

Federal office holders

 U.S. Senator from Michigan: Debbie Stabenow (Democrat)
 U.S. Senator from Michigan: Gary Peters (Democrat) 
 House District 1: Jack Bergman (Republican)
 House District 2: Bill Huizenga (Republican)
 House District 3: Justin Amash (Republican)
 House District 4: John Moolenaar (Republican)
 House District 5: Dan Kildee (Democrat)
 House District 6: Fred Upton (Republican)
 House District 7: Tim Walberg (Republican)
 House District 8: Elissa Slotkin (Democrat)
 House District 9: Andy Levin (Democrat)
 House District 10: Paul Mitchell (Republican)
 House District 11: Haley Stevens (Democrat)
 House District 12: Debbie Dingell (Democrat)
 House District 13: Rashida Tlaib (Democrat)
 House District 14: Brenda Lawrence (Democrat)

Population
In the 2010 United States Census, Michigan was recorded as having a population of 9,883,640 persons, ranking as the eighth most populous state in the country. By 2018, the state's population was estimated at 9,995,915, and the state had become the 10th most populous state.

The state's largest cities, having populations of at least 75,000 based on 2019 estimates, were as follows:

Sports

Baseball
 2019 Detroit Tigers season – Under manager Ron Gardenhire, the Tigers compiled a 47–114 record, the worst record in Major League Baseball. The team's statistical leaders included Harold Castro with a .291 batting average, Brandon Dixon with 15 home runs, Miguel Cabrera with 59 RBIs, Buck Farmer with a 3.72 earned run average, and Matthew Boyd with 238 strikeouts and nine wins.

American football
 2019 Detroit Lions season - Under head coach Matt Patricia, the team compiled a 2–3–1 record through the first six games.
 2019 Michigan Wolverines football team - Under head coach Jim Harbaugh the team compiled a 5–2 record through the first seven games.
 2019 Michigan State Spartans football team - Under head coach Mark Dantonio the team compiled a 4–3 record through the first seven games. 
 2019 Central Michigan Chippewas football team - Under head coach Jim McElwain the team compiled a 5–3 record through the first eight games.
 2019 Eastern Michigan Eagles football team - Under head coach Chris Creighton the team compiled a 4–3 record through the first seven games.
 2019 Western Michigan Broncos football team - Under head coach Tim Lester the team compiled a 4–4 record through the first eight games.

Basketball
 2018–19 Detroit Pistons season – Under head coach Dwane Casey, the Pistons compiled a 41–41 record. The team's statistical leaders included Blake Griffin with 402 assists and 1,841 points and Andre Drummond with 1,232 rebounds.
 2018–19 Michigan Wolverines men's basketball team – Under head coach John Beilein, the Wolverines compiled a 30–7 and were ranked No. 8 in the final AP poll.
 2018–19 Michigan State Spartans men's basketball team – Under head coach Tom Izzo, the Spartans compiled a 32–7 record, were ranked No. 5 in the AP poll, and advanced to the Final Four.
 2018–19 Michigan Wolverines women's basketball team – Under head coach Kim Barnes Arico, the Wolverines compiled a 22–12 record.
 2018–19 Michigan State Spartans women's basketball team – Under head coach Suzy Merchant, the Spartans compiled a 21–12 record.

Ice hockey
 2018–19 Detroit Red Wings season – Under head coach Jeff Blashill, the Wings compiled a 32–40–10 record.
 2018–19 Michigan Wolverines men's ice hockey season – Under head coach Mel Pearson, the Wolverines compiled a 13–16–7 record.

Music and culture
 January 19 - Greta Van Fleet, a rock band from Frankenmuth, Michigan, featuring three Kiszka brothers, appeared on Saturday Night Live, performing "Black Smoke Rising" and "You're the One".
 February 10 - From the Fires by Greta Van Fleet won the 2019 Grammy Award for Best Rock Album.
 February 23 - Eminem celebrated the 20th anniversary of the release of "The Slim Shady LP". A 20th anniversary digital edition was released with bonus tracks, rarities, a capellas, freestyles, and instrumentals.
 March 10 - "Aretha! A Grammy Celebration for the Queen of Soul", a tribute concert for Aretha Franklin taped on January 13 in Los Angeles, aired on CBS.
 April 21 - "Motown 60: A Grammy Celebration", a tribune concert celebrating the 60th anniversary of the founding of Motown Records held in February, aired on CBS.
 May 3 - Jack White received an honorary degree from Wayne State University as part of the school's commencement ceremony at Detroit's Fox Theatre.
 June 5 - The address of the DTE Energy Music Theatre in Clarkston, Michigan, was changed from 7774 Sashabaw to 33 Bob Seger Drive, as a tribute to Bob Seger's 33 shows at the theatre. As part of his farewell tour, the 74-year-old Seger performed six shows at DTE as part of his Roll Me Away farewell tour.
 June 7 - The album Scriptures by Detroit rapper Tee Grizzley was released and reached No. 9 on the U.S. rap chart.
 June 14 - Madonna's 14th studio album "Madame X" was released. It reached No. 1 on the Billboard album chart.
 August 23 - "Hitsville: The Making of Motown", a documentary produced by Berry Gordy, premiered in Royal Oak before airing the following night on Showtime.
 September 6 - Kid Rock started a four-show stand at DTE Energy Music Theatre.
 October 18 - "Stacked", the debut album from Detroit rapper Kash Doll, was released. She also performed on singles in 2019 with Lil Wayne, Big Sean, and Iggy Azalea, and signed as an opening performer for Meek Mill's 2019 The Motivation Tour.
 To be determined - The album Don Life by Detroit rapper Big Sean is scheduled for release in October or November. His prior albums in 2015 and 2017 both went to No. 1 on the Billboard 200 album chart.

Chronology of events

January
 January 1 - Democrat Gretchen Whitmer was sworn in as the 49th Governor of Michigan on the Capitol grounds in Lansing
 January 3 - Democrat Rashida Tlaib, the first Palestinian-American elected to Congress, and three other new members of the House from Michigan (Andy Levin, Elissa Slotkin, and Haley Stevens) were sworn in. Tlaib drew national attention with her public call to "impeach the mother****er" in reference to President Trump.
 January 6 - An Arab-American family of five from Northville, Michigan, was killed by a wrong-way driver on I-75
 January 7 - Uber driver Jason Dalton pled guilty to six counts of first-degree murder in the 2016 Kalamazoo shootings.
 January 9 - Fiat Chrysler agreed to pay $650 million to settle claims that it cheated on emissions tests.
 January 12 - The 60th anniversary of Motown Records was celebrated in Detroit.
 January 15 - Ford and Volkswagen announce a new business alliance.
 January 16 - Hours before the board was scheduled to meet to consider firing him, John Engler resigned as interim president of Michigan State University. He was criticized for his handling of the university's response to the Larry Nassar sex abuse scandal.
 January 30 - A U.S. Department of Education report on the Nassar sex abuse scandal was highly critical of Michigan State University's handling of reports of sexual abuse.

February
 February 21 - Michigan Attorney General Dana Nessel announced an investigation into George Perles' resignation from the Michigan State University Board of Trustees and the decision to waive a debt owed by Perles to the university.
 February 26 - Fiat Chrysler announced plans to convert Detroit's Mack Avenue engine factor into a new assembly plant for its Jeep division, as part of a $4.5 billion investment in southeastern Michigan. The plant was touted as the city's first new auto assembly plant in a generation.

March
 March 31 - The 2018–19 Michigan State Spartans men's basketball team defeated No. 1 seed Duke, 68-67 in the Elite Eight round of the 2019 NCAA Division I men's basketball tournament. The Spartans advanced to the Final Four but lost to Texas Tech in the National Semifinals on April 6.

April
 Steve Yzerman returned to the Detroit Red Wings as the club's general manager.

May

June

July

August
 August 15 - Under pressure from President Trump, Israel Prime Minister Benjamin Netanyahu banned Michigan Congresswoman Rashida Tlaib from visiting Israel.

September
 September 2 - Gov. Gretchen Whitmer led 20,000 to 30,000 persons in the 62nd annual Labor Day Mackinac Bridge Walk.
 September 5 - The U.S. Department of Education imposed a record $4.5 million fine against Michigan State University for its mishandling of the Larry Nassar sexual abuse case.
 September 15 - The UAW declared a nationwide strike against General Motors, aka the 2019 General Motors strike. It was first nationwide strike by the UAW since 2007. Two days later, GM stopped paying health insurance premiums for striking workers.
 A 34-year-old Detroit man, Deangelo Martin, was arrested and charged with killing four women on Detroit's east side.

October
 October 21 - The U.S. Supreme Court revered a Sixth Circuit decision challenging Republican-drawn electoral maps as being based on partisan gerrymandering.

November

December
 December 18 - On the day President Trump was impeached by the House of Representatives, he appeared at a rally in Battle Creek. Trump was criticized for a statement made at the rally suggesting that recently-deceased Michigan Congressman John Dingell was in hell.

Deaths
 January 6 – Robert L. Kahn, expert on organizational theory and former head of University of Michigan Survey Research Center, at age 100 in Burlington, Vermont
 February 7 – John Dingell, U.S. Congressman (1955–2015), at age 92 in Dearborn, Michigan
 February 20 – William Broomfield, U.S. Congressman (1957–1993), at age 96 in Kensington, Maryland
 March 4 – Ted Lindsay, NHL player (1944–65) and Red Wings (1944–57), inducted Hockey Hall of Fame, at age 93 in Oakland, Michigan
 April 2 – Don Williamson, Mayor of Flint (2003–09), at age 85
 April 28 – Damon Keith, U.S. Court of Appeals judge (1977–2019), at age 96 in Detroit
 May 2 – Red Kelly, NHL player (1947–67) and Red Wings (1947–60), inducted into Hockey Hall of Fame, at age 91 in Toronto
 May 29 – Loren E. Monroe, first African American Michigan State Treasurer, at age 87
 July 2 – Lee Iacocca, automotive executive with Ford (1946–78) and Chrysler (1978–92), at age 94 in Los Angeles
 July 3 – Arte Johnson, comic actor and Michigan native, at age 90 in Los Angeles
 July 6 – Gus Stager, University of Michigan swimmer (1947-48) and swimming coach (1955–82), 5x team national champion (1948, 1957-59, 1961), at age 96
 July 20 – R. James Harvey, U.S. Congressman and (1961–1974), U.S. District Court judge (1973–2019), at age 97 in Naples, Florida
 August 3 – L. Brooks Patterson, Oakland County prosecutor (1976–1992) and executive (1993–2019), at age 80 in Independence Township, Michigan
 September 3 - Detroit Lions superfan Donnie Stefanski, known as "Yooperman", at age 61 in Goetzville, Michigan
 September 21 – Napoleon Chagnon, anthropologist and expert on Amazon tribes, at age 81 in Traverse City, Michigan
 October 18 – William Milliken, Governor of Michigan (1969–1983), at age 97 in Traverse City, Michigan
 October 27 - John Conyers, the longest-serving black Congressman, at age 90 in Detroit
 October 30 - Bob Traxler, U.S. Congressman from Michigan's 8th District (1974-1993), at age 88 in Bay City
 November 11 - Charles Rogers, All-American wide receiver for Michigan State who also played for the Detroit Lions, at age 38 in Florida
 November 24 - Hank Bullough, American football player for Michigan State in the 1950s, at age 85
 December 7 - Bump Elliott, Michigan football player (1946-47) and head coach (1959-68), at age 94 in Iowa
 December 24 - Allee Willis, songwriter and Detroit native who was inducted into the Songwriters Hall of Fame, at age 72 in Los Angeles

Gallery of 2019 deaths

References